Gianni Motta–Linea M.D. Italia was an American professional cycling team that competed in the 1984 Giro d'Italia, becoming the first American registered team to compete in the race. The concept of the team was first formed by John Eustice, a rider, and Robin Morton who became the team's manager. The team was sponsored by Gianni Motta's bicycle brand, which was just starting to be distributed in the United States, and also sponsored by Italian furniture maker Linea MD.

Major wins
1984
  National Road Race Claude Michely

Roster
Ages as of 1 January 1984.

National Champions
1984
 Luxembourg Road Race, Claude Michely

References

External Links
Team Page on Pro Cycling Stats

Defunct cycling teams based in the United States
Cycling teams established in 1984
Cycling teams disestablished in 1984